The Tombs of the Kings ( Keveri HaMlakhim;) are a rock-cut funerary complex in East Jerusalem believed to be the burial site of Queen Helene of Adiabene (died c. 50–56 CE), hence: Helena's Monuments. The tombs are located 820 meters (half a mile) north of Jerusalem's Old City walls in the Sheikh Jarrah neighborhood

The grandeur of the site led to the belief that the tombs had once been the burial place of the kings of Judah, hence the name Tombs of the Kings; but the tombs are now associated with Queen Helena of Adiabene. According to this theory, Queen Helena chose the site to bury her son Isates and others of her dynasty. More recent research by noted French scholar and Dominican monk Jean-Baptiste Humbert has concluded that the tomb was likely designed for Herod Agrippa I, the grandson of Herod the Great.

The site is located east of the intersection of Nablus Road and Saladin Street. The gate of the property is marked "Tombeau des Rois", French for "Tomb of the Kings."

Public access

On May 15, 2019, Hekdesh, a Jewish organisation (Association Hekdesh du Tombeau des rois), hired Gilles-William Goldnadel, a French lawyer, and took the French government to court. Goldnadel tried to prove that the site, after being purchased in 1878 by a French-Jewish woman, Berthe Amélie Bertrand, or by the brothers Péreire, French-Jewish bankers, was left to the French state on condition that the Jews would preserve the right to visit the site (see below at History). Goldnadel also hopes to reclaim the sarcophagus of queen Helena of Adiabene, presently housed at the Louvre.

On June 27, 2019, the French consulate in Jerusalem reopened the site to visitors purchasing tickets in advance.

General layout
Alongside the staircase there is built a drainage system and cisterns. The main courtyard sinks down to a depth of  within the bedrock and has a total measurement of approximately  x . The portal is on its western façade and is ascended by a flight of three steps. In front of the burial cave formerly stood two pillars and two pilasters carved in the rock face and which are now scarcely visible. Above the portal is a Doric frieze, made of metopes and triglyphs, with a cluster of grapes in the center and wreaths of acanthus leaves next to it. A leaf plexus extends along the architrave.

The inner tomb is made-up of a complex labyrinth consisting of eight chambers, with a total of 48 burial niches, some of which formerly contained decorated sarcophagi. The chambers of the royal tomb are made with both kokhim (burial niches) in the old Jewish style, and arcosolia in the Roman fashion.

History

Queen Helena of Adiabene
The tomb is mentioned by the Roman-Jewish historian Josephus in the first century CE. He writes about Helena, queen of Adiabene, a small kingdom from Mesopotamia (today part of Kurdistan, northern Iraq) who came to Jerusalem at the end of the Second Temple Period. Her family converted to Judaism and built a palace in the area today known as the City of David. Helena's son Monobaz II had her remains and those of his brother buried "three stadia from Jerusalem." Medieval Europeans mistakenly identified the tomb as belonging to the kings of Judah.

Discovery and exploration

In 1847, the Turkish governor ordered a search for treasures in the tomb but none were found.
In 1863, the French archaeologist Félicien de Saulcy was given permission to excavate the tomb.
The German architect Conrad Schick drew up a map of the site. De Saulcy found sarcophagi, one of which was bearing the Hebrew inscription "Queen Tzaddah". He believed this was the sarcophagus of the wife of Zedekiah, the last king of Judah.

After human bones were found, the Jewish community appealed to Sir Moses Montefiore to persuade the Ottomans to halt the excavations. De Saulcy smuggled out some of his findings, which are now at the Louvre in Paris.

Purchase and property
In 1864, the French-Jewish banker Isaac Péreire attempted to purchase the site but without success. In the 1870s, a French-Jewish woman, Amalya Bertrand, paid 30,000 francs for it. It was registered as French property under the trusteeship of the French consul. Bertrand declared: "I am of the firm opinion that this property, the field and the burial cave of the kings, will become the land in perpetuity of the Jewish community, to be preserved from desecration and abomination, and will never again be damaged by foreigners. She had a wall and guard post built around the site. In 1886, Bertrand's heirs donated it to the French government "to preserve it for science and the worship of the faithful children of Israel".

Traditions
The Tomb of the Kings was described by the Greek geographer Pausanias as the second most beautiful tomb in the world (after the tomb of Mausolus, one of the Seven Wonders of the Ancient World) who visited in Jerusalem. He declares that he "knows many wonderful tombs" and mentions two of them, one of which is in Halicarnassus and the other "in [the Land of] the Hebrews" (Greek: ἐν τῇ Ἑβραίων) and has a sophisticated opening mechanism aimed at a certain day of the year and for a certain time: "The Hebrews have a tomb, that of Helena, a local woman, in the city of Jerusalem (Greek:πόλει Σολύμοις), which the Roman emperor razed to the ground. There is a contrivance in the tomb whereby the door, which like the entire tomb is made of stone, does not open until the year brings back the same day and the same hour. Then the mechanism, unaided, opens the door, which, after a short interval, closes itself again. It happens at the same time, but if you try at any other time to open the door, you will not be able to do so; Power will not open it, but will only break it."

A small stone house was built on top of the tomb by Irhimeh clan, a Jerusalemite family.

Archaeological findings

From the house there is a 9 meter wide staircase (23 steps) that was originally paved and leads to a forecourt. The rain water is collected in baths, which are carved in the steps, and carried via a channel system to the water wells. At the bottom of the stairs there are ancient ritual baths (mikva’ot) as well as a stone wall to the left with a gate. This gate leads to a courtyard that was cut from the rock at the same date. The dimensions of this courtyard are roughly 27 meters long from north to south and 25 meters wide from west to east.

The entrance to the tombs is via this courtyard. The tombs are entered via a rock-cut arch (facade) in the western side. The 28-meter facade was originally crowned with three pyramids, which no longer exist, and decorated with reliefs of grapes, plexus leaves, acorns and fruit, reflecting the Greek architectural style. The architrave was originally supported by two pillars, fragments of which were found in the excavations.

The tombs are arranged on two levels around a central chamber, with four rooms upstairs and three rooms downstairs. The central chamber itself is entered from the courtyard via an antechamber that goes down into a dimly lit maze of chambers. The access from the antechamber to the exterior courtyard could be sealed closed by rolling a round stone across it, and the stone still remains in-situ. In the first century CE, a "secret mechanism" operated by water pressure moved the stone. Probably a small amount of water pressure activated a system of weights to open the tomb. Two of the eight burial chambers have arcosolia, resting places made of a bench with an arch over it. Some of the arcosolia have triangular niches where oil lamps were placed to give light during the burial process.

The two most common types of tombs in the first century CE are found in this tomb complex. Shaft tombs were long narrow shafts in which the deceased were placed and closed with a stone slab which probably had the name of the occupant inscribed on it. Channels in the center of the shafts were probably carved to drain the water that seeped through the rock.

The tombs are now empty, but previously housed a number of sarcophagi; they were excavated by a French archaeological mission headed by Louis Felicien de Saulcy, who took them back to France. They are exhibited at the Louvre.

Although no kings are known to have been buried here, one of the sarcophagi bears two Aramaic inscriptions and is thought to be that of Queen Helena of Adiabene; the one inscription which reads, Ṣaddan Malkata (Palmyrene: צדן מלכתא), and the other, Ṣaddah Malkatah (Aramaic: צדה מלכתה), interpreted by scholars to mean: "Our mistress, the Queen." The sarcophagus is now at the Louvre Museum in Paris. The decorative architecture of the tomb complex is Seleucid, which would fit with this identification.

See also
 Rock-cut tombs in ancient Israel

External links
 Tomb of the Kings Battle Brews Between French and ultra-Orthodox Over Jerusalem Archaeology Site, Nir Hasson for Haaretz, 21 December 2018

References

Archaeological sites in Jerusalem
Buildings and structures in Jerusalem
Buildings and structures in the West Bank
Rock-cut tombs
Tourist attractions in Jerusalem
Historic sites in Jerusalem
Jewish catacombs
Overseas France
Sheikh Jarrah
Tombs in Israel